Gustavo Nery de Sá da Silva (born 22 July 1977) is a Brazilian former professional footballer who played as a left-back.

Career
In February 2014, it was announced Nery would join Bundesliga club Werder Bremen on a four-year contract from São Paulo in the summer. The transfer fee to be paid to São Paulo was reported as €500,000 or €600,000. He missed the beginning of training in the summer due to being called up to the Brazil national team. He was later kept out of action by a hand injury. In his time at Werder Bremen he was often injured and unable to secure a first-team spot, making three league appearances, two of which were substitute appearances.

Nery left Werder Bremen to join Corinthians on loan in February 2005. Corinthians also received a option to sign Nery permanently for a reported transfer fee of about €1.5 million.

Nery joined La Liga side Zaragoza on loan from Corinthians for the second half of the 2006–07 season.

Honours
Corinthians
 Campeonato Brasileiro Série A: 2005

São Paulo
 Torneio Rio-São Paulo: 2001
 Supercampeonato Paulista: 2002

Internacional
 Copa Sudamericana: 2008

Brazil
 Copa América: 2004

Individual
 Campeonato Brasileiro Série A Team of the Year: 2005

References

External links
 

1977 births
Living people
People from Nova Friburgo
Association football fullbacks
Brazil international footballers
2001 FIFA Confederations Cup players
2004 Copa América players
Brazilian footballers
Campeonato Brasileiro Série A players
Bundesliga players
La Liga players
Guarani FC players
Real Zaragoza players
Sport Club Corinthians Paulista players
Sport Club Internacional players
São Paulo FC players
Santos FC players
SV Werder Bremen players
Esporte Clube Santo André players
Copa América-winning players
Brazilian expatriate footballers
Brazilian expatriate sportspeople in Germany
Expatriate footballers in Germany
Brazilian expatriate sportspeople in Spain
Expatriate footballers in Spain
Sportspeople from Rio de Janeiro (state)